Alberta Provincial Highway No. 519, commonly referred to as Highway 519, is an east-west highway in southern Alberta, Canada, stretching from Highway 2 near Granum through Picture Butte to Highway 845. In tandem with Highway 23, Highway 519 is often used by traffic in the CANAMEX Corridor to bypass Fort Macleod on the route between Calgary and Lethbridge.

Route description
Highway 519 is a two-lane undivided highway that begins in the Municipal District of Willow Creek in Granum at an intersection with Highway 2. After crossing into Lethbridge County, It reaches a roundabout at Highway 23, after which the speed limit drops to  before passing the town of Nobleford and crossing a branch of the Canadian Pacific Railway. The speed limit then increases to  again. North of Shaughnessy, it merges with Highway 25 with which it is briefly concurrent until Picture Butte where Highway 25 splits north to Iron Springs while Highway 519 continues east to end at Highway 845 near the Oldman River.

Major intersections

References 

519